The Malaysian Consultative Council of Buddhism, Christianity, Hinduism, Sikhism and Taoism (abbrev: MCCBCHST) is a non-profit interfaith organization in Malaysia. Initially formed in 1983 as the "Malaysian Consultative Council of Buddhism, Christianity, Hinduism and Sikhism", it is composed primarily of officials from the main non-Muslim faith communities in Malaysia and acts as a consultative and liaison body towards more open dialogue and co-operation. It prioritizes round-table dialogue as its principal means towards conflict resolution amongst all Malaysians, irrespective of creed, religion, race, culture, or gender. In 2006, Taoists were officially represented for the first time in the organization and the name was changed to the current form in their Annual General Meeting on 27 September of the same year. Their current vision is represented through the slogan "Many Faiths, One Nation."

Mission 
The Malaysian Consultative Council of Buddhism currently describes their aims and objectives through seven different subsets.

Composition 
The Malaysian Consultative Council of Buddhism, Christianity, Hinduism, Sikhism, and Taoism is composed of representative member bodies within each respective religion. 

Buddhism is represented by the Malaysian Buddhist Association (MBA), Buddhist Missionary Society Malaysia (BMSM) and the Sasana Wardhana Society (SAWS). 

Christianity is represented by the Christian Federation of Malaysia (CFM) [incorporating the Catholic Bishops Conference of Malaysia (CBCM), Council of Churches of Malaysia (CCM) and National Evangelical Christian Fellowship (NECF)].

Hinduism is represented by the Malaysia Hindu Sangam (MHS). 

Sikhism is represented by the Malaysian Gurdwaras Council (MGC), Khalsa Diwan Malaysia (KDM), and Sikh Naujawan Sabha Malaysia (SNSM).

Taoism is represented by the Federation of Taoist Associations MALAYSIA (FTAM).

Leadership 
The 2019-2021 Executive Board for the Malaysian Consultative Council of Buddhism, Christianity, Hinduism, Sikhism, and Taoism:

Recognition 
In May of 2020, the World Health Organization (WHO) partnered with the MCCBHST and other faith-based organizations in Malaysia to commemorate Wesak Day. The WHO worked closely with the MCCBHST to devise a set of six simple, positive tips depicting small family group worshipping and safe temple-based activities for the COVID-19 pandemic. Venerable Sing Kan, Vice President of the MCCBHST, was quoted by the WHO in response to a movement control order that was issued by the Malaysian Government to regulate the celebration. He stated, "The conditional movement control order raised a lot of questions about Wesak Day - what we could and couldn't do, what were safe alternatives to gathering and festivities during this Holy Day, and most importantly how could we keep ourselves and families safe from COVID-19." 

On May 12, 2021, the U.S. Department of State Office of International Religious Freedom released the 2020 Report on International Religious Freedom: Malaysia. Section III, Status of Societal Respect for Religious Freedom, directly quoted a press statement made by the MCCBHST in September 2020. The report expressed the MCCBHST's "grave concern on the escalation of religious animosity between religious groups manufactured by some politicians to divide and rule."

See also 
 Freedom of religion in Malaysia

References

External links 
 Official website of the MCCBCHST

1983 establishments in Malaysia
Religious organizations established in 1983
Religious organisations based in Malaysia
Human rights organisations based in Malaysia
Freedom of religion
Interfaith organizations
Religion in Malaysia
Buddhism in Malaysia
Christianity in Malaysia
Hinduism in Malaysia
Sikhism in Malaysia
Taoism in Malaysia